Le Val-Saint-Père is a commune in the Manche department in Normandy in northwestern France.

Geography
Le Val-Saint-Père is situated on the Saint-Michel bay, and is near Avranches, Saint-Martin-des-Champs, Saint-Loup, Saint-Quentin-sur-le-Homme and Pontaubault.

History

Administration

Demographics
The commune's population has held remarkably steady during the preceding two centuries, only showing a marked increase (100% growth) since the 1970s:

Points of interest
The Avranches airfield is situated in Val-Saint-Père, in Bouillé.
Le Gué de l'Épine affords a view of Mont Saint-Michel.

See also
Communes of the Manche department

References

Valsaintpere